Nikolskoe Cemetery is part of the Alexander Nevsky Lavra in the centre of Saint Petersburg, and contains a large number of burials as well as monuments and memorials to notable figures in Russian Imperial history, as well as those of Soviet and post-Soviet times.

The cemetery, opened in 1863, was the third cemetery in the monastery complex, after the original Lazarevskoe Cemetery in the 1710s, and the Tikhvin Cemetery in 1823. It became known as the Nikolskoe after the construction of the Church of St. Nicholas between 1868 and 1871 to the design of diocesan architect Grigory Karpov. From its inception burial there was restricted to the elite of society, the monastery's Spiritual Council noting that "the Lavra cemetery is not open to everyone, as are the city cemeteries, but only a few persons from the government service and persons with honorary titles are buried here." Part of the cemetery also served as the burial site for the Monastery's monks and the metropolitans of St. Petersburg, leading to the name Bratskoe, or "Brotherhood" section.

Despite this the cemetery was not considered to have any particular artistic or historical value during the Soviet period. It was closed in 1927 and sporadic efforts were made during the 1930s and 1940s to eliminate it, with the graves of several prominent figures were transferred to the Lazarevskoe, Tikhvin and Volkovo cemeteries; including Vera Komissarzhevskaya, Ivan Goncharov, Anton Rubinstein and Boris Kustodiev. Other graves were lost or destroyed. The Church of St Nicholas was closed in 1932, and the cemetery fell into neglect.

The Nikolskoe Cemetery was restored and landscaped in the 1970s, with a columbarium built between 1979 and 1980. The cemetery church was repaired and reconsecrated on 22 April 1985. Burials resumed in the late 1970s, and since 1989 a comprehensive restoration of monuments has been underway.

Burials and monuments

References

Nikolskoe Cemetery
Cemeteries in Saint Petersburg

Cemeteries in the Alexander Nevsky Lavra